Kilton Viaduct was a railway viaduct that straddled Kilton Beck, near to Loftus, in North Yorkshire, England. The viaduct was opened to traffic in 1867, however in 1911, with the viaduct suffering subsidence from the nearby ironstone mining, the whole structure was encased in waste material from the mines creating an embankment which re-opened fully to traffic in 1913. The railway closed in 1963, but then in 1974, it re-opened as part of the freight line to Boulby Mine carrying potash traffic.

History

Between Skinningrove and Loftus railway stations, the line crossed a  ravine through which Kilton Beck flows. The line was opened to traffic in 1867. The viaduct, which was built to a design by Sir James Brunlees, was also sometimes known as Kilton Beck Viaduct.

The span was deliberately wider than the other piers as it was built to accommodate three tracks side by side. The main pier of the wider (thirteenth) span was a trapezoid shape at the bottom where it was rooted into the ground. Again, this was to enable the accommodation of the line on the curved viaduct. Although the viaduct was constructed with the correct width for two lines, only one line was ever laid or used. The bridge deck was constructed from a metal lattice-girder, and the piers were built of stone.

However, by 1911, the effects of the subsidence was so bad that action was taken to remedy the problem. The line closed to freight traffic, and a culvert across Kilton Beck was constructed to allow the free flow of water. It was constructed from ferro-concrete and was re-inforced with Kahn steel bars. This was due to the loads involved on the structure, and to combat the possible future effects of subsidence from ironstone mining. Some  of ironstone waste from the Cargo Fleet Iron Company mine at Liverton, was poured through the lattice girders to create an embankment. However, the operation was halted for two weeks when one of the piers showed signs of stress (probably due to inaccurate pouring of the shale), but eventually, the embankment was opened to all traffic in 1913. Whilst the viaduct was closed completely for two weeks, passengers were conveyed between Skinningrove and Loftus railway stations by a motor char-à-banc. The zig-zag line was amended so it ran alongside the embankment formation rather than through it, but at a lower level. 

The railway south to Loftus across the embankment closed to passengers in 1960, and then completely in August 1963. However, the line between Skinningrove and Boulby re-opened in 1974 for potash traffic. Paths exist alongside the line across the embankment, with walkers and cyclists saying that the views are "fabulous". Although the line is now closed south of Boulby, the next viaduct south was the now dismantled Staithes Viaduct. Northwards it is Upleatham/Skelton/Saltburn Viaduct.

References

Sources

External links

Image of viaduct with a breakdown train on it after an accident

Railway viaducts in North Yorkshire
Former railway bridges in the United Kingdom
Buried viaducts
Rail transport in North Yorkshire
Bridges completed in 1867